João Neto can refer to:

Arts and Entertainment
 João Simões Lopes Neto (1865-1916), Brazilian writer
 João Cabral de Melo Neto (1920-1999), Brazilian poet and diplomat
 João Neto & Frederico, Brazilian country music duo

Sports
 João Costa Lima Neto (born 1947), Brazilian swimmer
 João Neto (sailor) (born 1958), Angolan sailor
 Joãozinho Neto (born 1980), Brazilian football forward
 João Neto (judoka) (born 1981), Portuguese judoka
 João Neto (futsal player) (born 1991), Brazilian futsal player
 João Neto (footballer, born May 2003), Brazilian football winger
 João Neto (footballer, born July 2003), Brazilian football forward